Jementah is a mukim in Segamat District, Johor, Malaysia.

Name
There are two versions of stories of how Jementah got its name. The first version was during the foundation of a village which later became Jementah town center, some villagers complained, "Jemu, jemu, jemu! Asyik-asyik menebas lalang saja!" which literally meant that they felt bored for only cutting long grasses, and the others replied, "Entah, entah, entah!" (I don't know, I don't know, I don't know!). From the Malay words jemu and entah, local residents believed that the combination of those words formed the word Jementah.

Another version stated that the villagers were bored and tired of removing leeches which sucked their blood when they were working, and therefore the combination of the words jemu and lintah which means leech in Malay formed the word Jementah.

History
Jementah was once a site of the historic civil war in modern Johor history known as Jementah Civil War on 25 October 1879.

Geography

With a total area of 228 km2, Jementah is the 5th largest mukim in Segamat District.

Demographics

As of 2010, Jementah has a total population of 18,823 people.

Economy
The town is the largest pomelo producer in Johor. It is also famous for its durian produce.

Education

University
 Universiti Teknologi MARA Johor Campus branch

Secondary school
Sekolah Menengah Kebangsaan Tun Sri Lanang
Sekolah Menengah Kebangsaan Seri Jementah
Sekolah Menengah Kebangsaan Jementah

Primary school

Sekolah Kebangsaan Seri Jaya
Sekolah Kebangsaan RKT Sri Ledang
Sekolah Kebangsaan Paya Jakas
Sekolah Kebangsaan Ladang Welch
Sekolah Kebangsaan Jementah
Sekolah Kebangsaan Bukit Tunggal
Sekolah Jenis Kebangsaan (Tamil) Ladang Nagappa
Sekolah Jenis Kebangsaan (Cina) Lian Hwa
Sekolah Jenis Kebangsaan (Cina) Kebun Bahru
Sekolah Jenis Kebangsaan (Cina) Jementah 1
Sekolah Jenis Kebangsaan (Cina) Jementah (2)

Transportation
Strategically located 16 km from Segamat Town via Federal Route 23.

See also 
 Segamat
 Sultan Abu Bakar of Johor

References

Mukims of Segamat District